Call Me Mame is a 1933 British comedy film directed by John Daumery and starring Ethel Irving, John Batten and Dorothy Bartlam. It was made at Teddington Studios as a quota quickie.

Cast
 Ethel Irving as Mame  
 John Batten as Gordon Roantree  
 Dorothy Bartlam as Tess Lennox  
 Winifred Oughton as Victoria  
 Julian Royce as Poulton  
 Arthur Maude as Father  
 Alice O'Day as Mother  
 Pat Fitzpatrick as Child  
 Carroll Gibbons as Leader of the Savoy Orpheans

References

Bibliography
 Chibnall, Steve. Quota Quickies: The Birth of the British 'B' Film. British Film Institute, 2007.
 Low, Rachael. Filmmaking in 1930s Britain. George Allen & Unwin, 1985.
 Wood, Linda. British Films, 1927-1939. British Film Institute, 1986.

External links
 

1933 films
British comedy films
1933 comedy films
Films shot at Teddington Studios
Warner Bros. films
Quota quickies
Films directed by Jean Daumery
British black-and-white films
1930s English-language films
1930s British films